Cainocreadium is a genus of trematodes in the family Opecoelidae. It has been synonymised with Apopodocotyle Pritchard, 1966, Cainocreadoides Nagaty, 1956, and Emmettrema Caballero y Caballero, 1946.

Species
Cainocreadium alanwilliamsi Bray, 1990
Cainocreadium bolivari (Caballero y Caballero & Caballero Rodríguez, 1970) Martin, Cutmore, Ward & Cribb, 2017
Cainocreadium consuetum (Linton, 1910) Yamaguti, 1971
Cainocreadium dentecis Jousson & Bartoli, 2001
Cainocreadium epinepheli (Yamaguti, 1934) [emend. Nagaty, 1956] Durio & Manter, 1968
Cainocreadium flesi Korniychuk & Gaevskaya, 2000
Cainocreadium gulella (Linton, 1910) Durio & Manter, 1968
Cainocreadium labracis (Dujardin, 1845) Nicoll, 1909
Cainocreadium lariosi (Caballero y Caballero, 1946) [emend. Yamaguti, 1953] Cribb, 2005
Cainocreadium lintoni (Siddiqi & Cable, 1960) Durio & Manter, 1968
Cainocreadium longisaccum (Siddiqi & Cable, 1960) Durio & Manter, 1968
Cainocreadium musculometra (Bravo-Hollis & Manter, 1957) [emend. Pritchard, 1966] Martin, Cutmore, Ward & Cribb, 2017
Cainocreadium oscitans (Linton, 1910) [emend. Pritchard, 1966] Cribb, 2005
Cainocreadium pteroisi (Nagaty & Abdel-Aal, 1962) Durio & Manter, 1968
Cainocreadium serrani (Nagaty, 1956) Manter, 1963
Cainocreadium xishaense (Shen, 1985) Martin, Cutmore, Ward & Cribb, 2017

References

Opecoelidae
Plagiorchiida genera